The Czech Republic are one of the major teams in international speedway. They have never won the competition but have appeared in eight finals.

Speedway World Team Cup

Team U-21 World Championship

Team U-19 European Championship 

Squad for 2009 Championship was nominated in October 2008 by Team manager Milan Špinka:
 Michael Hádek (date of birth 1990-05-08)
 Jan Holub III (1991-08-07)
 Václav Milík Jr. (1993-05-22)
 Roman Čejka (1993-08-27)
 Michal Dudek (1990-09-20)

Famous Czech riders 

 Bohumil Brhel
 Aleš Dryml Sr.
 Aleš Dryml Jr.
 Lukáš Dryml
 Antonín Kasper Sr.
 Antonín Kasper Jr.
 Petr Ondrašík
 Jiří Štancl
 Antonín Šváb Jr.
 Luboš Tomíček Sr.
 Luboš Tomíček Jr.
 Tomáš Topinka
 Jan Verner
 Václav Verner

See also 
 Motorcycle speedway

References 

National speedway teams
Speedway
!